The cuneiform alphabetic um sign, also dup, tup, ṭup, and DUB, the Sumerogram (logogram), for Akkadian language "ṭuppu", (= the clay tablet), is found in both the 14th century BC Amarna letters and the Epic of Gilgamesh. In the Amarna letters as um, it is found as um-ma in the introduction of the letters as "Message (thus)"...(and then the PN (personal name) of the individual sending, or authoring the letter).

In specific texts with dialogue, for example Amarna letter EA 19, Love and Gold, an extensive discussion is made by the king of Babylon about his father, ancestry, friendship between kings, envoys, women (for the harem, or wife), etc., and consequently the dialogue is preceded by um-ma ("quote"), then the dialogue by the messenger, (or the king).

References

Moran, William L. 1987, 1992. The Amarna Letters. Johns Hopkins University Press, 1987, 1992. 393 pages.(softcover)
 Parpola, 1971. The Standard Babylonian Epic of Gilgamesh, Parpola, Simo, Neo-Assyrian Text Corpus Project, c 1997, Tablet I through Tablet XII, Index of Names, Sign List, and Glossary-(pp. 119–145), 165 pages.
Rainey, 1970. El Amarna Tablets, 359-379, Anson F. Rainey, (AOAT 8, Alter Orient Altes Testament 8, Kevelaer and Neukirchen -Vluyen), 1970, 107 pages.

Cuneiform signs